Mohammad Bayati (born May 5, 1932) is an Iranian football goalkeeper who played for Iran in the 1964 Summer Olympics . He also played for Taj SC.

Record at Olympic Games

References

External links
 
 
 
 

Iran international footballers
Iranian footballers
Esteghlal F.C. players
1932 births
Living people
Olympic footballers of Iran
Footballers at the 1958 Asian Games
Tractor S.C. managers
Association football goalkeepers
Footballers at the 1964 Summer Olympics
Asian Games competitors for Iran
Iranian football managers